Norma is the sixth studio album by Chilean singer Mon Laferte, released on November 9, 2018. The album was published through Universal Music México.

At the 20th Annual Latin Grammy Awards Norma won in the category Best Alternative Music Album.

Background 
Norma is a conceptual album that tells the different stages of love, each song will tell part of a story of the relationship, all of them have a music video. The name Norma comes from the artist's first name (Norma Monserrat Bustamante Laferte), that she did not like but she used it to show that in her life love always follows the same "norma" (norm).

Norma was recorded in a single session at Studio A of Capitol Studios in Los Angeles, California, on June 16, 2018. The recording was made in a single shot, without using the overdubbing technique of layers of audio, but all the instruments playing simultaneously to give the material the sensation of live recording. 13 musicians participated in this recording. Omar Rodríguez-López was in charge of production; the recording engineer was Bruce Botnick.

Track listing

Personnel 
Credits adapted from Norma liner notes.

Vocals

 Mon Laferte – lead vocals
 David Aguilar – background vocals, lead vocals (track 10)
 Sebastián Aracena – background vocals

Musicians

 David Aguilar – guitar
 Sebastián Aracena – guitar
 Francesco Marcocci – bass guitar
 Leo Genovese – organ, piano
 Daniel Rotem – flute, saxophone
 Enrique Sánchez – trumpet
 Cameron Johnson – trumpet
 Jonah Levine – trombone
 Henry Solomon - saxophone, flute
 Willy Rodríguez – percussion, drums
 Daniel Díaz – percussion
 Etienne Rivera Cabello – percussion

Production

 Omar Rodríguez-López  – production, recording arrangements, programming
 Bruce Botnick – recording
 Jon Debaun – recording
 Rich Costey – mixing
Howie Weinberg- mastering

Recording

 Recorded at Capitol Studios, Los Angeles, California

Charts

Weekly charts

Year-end charts

Certifications

|-
| Chile (IFPI Chile)
| 2× Platinum
| 10 000*
|-

|-

References

2018 albums
Mon Laferte albums
Latin Grammy Award for Best Alternative Music Album

Albums recorded at Capitol Studios